The Hazen Strait is a natural waterway through the Canadian Arctic Archipelago. It separates Mackenzie King Island in the Northwest Territories (to the north) from Vesey Hamilton Island and Melville Island's Sabine Peninsula in Nunavut (to the south).

Straits of the Northwest Territories
Straits of Qikiqtaaluk Region
Borders of Nunavut
Borders of the Northwest Territories